Schwalmtal is a municipality in the Vogelsbergkreis in Hesse, Germany.

Geography

Neighbouring communities
Schwalmtal borders in the north on the towns of Alsfeld and Grebenau, in the east on the town of Lauterbach, in the south on the community of Lautertal, and in the west on the community of Feldatal and the town of Nidda (Wetteraukreis) and the town of Romrod.

Constituent communities
The community of Schwalmtal consists of 9 centres:
Brauerschwend (administrative seat)
Renzendorf
Rainrod
Hopfgarten
Hergersdorf
Ober- and Unter-Sorg
Vadenrod
Storndorf

Brauerschwend and Storndorf are the two biggest of these centres, the latter being slightly bigger than the former.

Politics
Currently represented on municipal council are three parties, the SPD, the CDU and the FWG (a citizens' coalition). The current mayor is an SPD member whose support on council derives from an SPD-FWG coalition.

Economy and Transport
The constituent communities of Brauerschwend and Storndorf each have a primary school, a kindergarten and a grocer's shop. Furthermore there is a butcher's shop in each as well as branches of the Kreissparkasse/VR-Bank. The community's main industrial area is to be found in Storndorf. Moreover, the district rubbish tip, administered by the ZAV (Zentralstelle für Arbeitsvermittlung, or "Central Post for Work Placement"), lies in the community's outlying countryside. In the constituent community of Hopfgarten is one of Hesse's few knacker's yards (where old horses are slaughtered and the by-products are sent for rendering).

Renzendorf is home to the community's only railway station, and a location of the Bäckerei Karl (bakery) whose head office is in Storndorf.

Brauerschwend and Storndorf each have a medical general practice and a dental practice.

Transport
Through the community runs Federal Highway (Bundesstraße) 254 from Alsfeld by way of Lauterbach to Fulda. Whereas until a few years ago it went through some of the communities, there is now a bypass.

References

External links
 Schwalmtal (Hessen)

Vogelsbergkreis
Grand Duchy of Hesse